Slovenia competed in the Winter Olympic Games for the first time as an independent nation at the 1992 Winter Olympics in Albertville, France.

Competitors
The following is the list of number of competitors in the Games.

Alpine skiing

Men

Men's combined

Women

Women's combined

Biathlon

Men

Men's 4 × 7.5 km relay

 1 A penalty loop of 150 metres had to be skied per missed target.
 2 One minute added per missed target.

Cross-country skiing

Men

 1 Starting delay based on 10 km results. 
 C = Classical style, F = Freestyle

Figure skating

Men

Women

Freestyle skiing

Men

Ski jumping 

Men's team large hill

 1 Four teams members performed two jumps each. The best three were counted.

References

Official Olympic Reports
 Olympic Winter Games 1992, full results by sports-reference.com

Nations at the 1992 Winter Olympics
Winter Olympics
1992 Winter Olympics